The first government lasted from June 28 1917 until August 13 when the Mala Rada accepted the resignation of V.Vynnychenko. Most ministers later were imprisoned by the Soviet regime, the rest managed to survive abroad.

Composition

The last three portfolios of the First Secretariat were added on July 13, three more (Trade/Industry, Labor, and Russian Affairs) assigned to Bolsheviks were never filled due to boycott.

Events
June 26, 1917 - announcement of the Declaration of General Secretariat at the plenum meeting of Central Rada
June 28, 1917 - First Cabinet with 9 portfolios (8 secretaries and 1 chancellor), the Secretary of Internal Affairs is the chairman
Before the July Days - meeting with the delegation from the Russian Provisional Government
July 13, 1917 - the General Secretariat was recognized as the highest executive power in Ukraine, members of which would be confirmed by the Russian Provisional Government, expansion of Secretariat with 6 more portfolios added (2 secretaries, 3 deputy-secretary of nationalities, and 1 controller)
End of July 1917 - during the political crisis in the republic meeting with members of the newly elected  Russian government, Kerensky's "Instruktsiya" recognizing the Statue and the jurisdiction of the General Secretariat over five guberniyas
August 7, 1917 - Vynnychenko files resignation in the protest to acceptance of "Instruktsiya" by Central Rada
August 13, 1917 - Central Rada accepts his resignation and appoints Dmytro Doroshenko as the new chairman, confirming his new government already the next day
August 18, 1917 - Doroshenko files resignation, Vynnychenko was offered to form a government once again

Deputy-Secretaries of Nationalities
Secretary of Nationalities was expanded by the request of the Provisional Government as the minority representatives to Undersecretaries of ethnic affairs (deputies) and soon on July 17 Yefremov was replaced by Oleksander Shulhyn.

At first the deputy secretaries of Nationalities were part of the secretariat of Nationalities headed initially by Yefremov. With the proclamation of the III Universal on December 22, 1917 on the initiative of Oleksandr Shulhyn the Secretariat of Nationalities was transformed into the Secretariat of Foreign Affairs. The position for the Russian Affairs representative for quite sometime was left unoccupied although was specifically reserved for the Russian Provisional Government. After the Secretariat was reorganized as the Council of Ministers the deputy-secretaries received their own ministerial assignments.

Prosecutions
 Six ministers were imprisoned (five died in prison): Serhiy Yefremov, Valentyn Sadovsky, Mykola Stasyuk, Pavlo Khrystiuk, Moisei Rafes, Vsevolod Holubovych
 Seven ministers emigrated: Volodymyr Vynnychenko, Moishe Zilberfarb, Mieczysław Mickiewicz, Khrystofor Baranovsky, Symon Petliura, Borys Martos, Mykola Stasyuk
 Confirmed assassinations: Symon Petliura, Ivan Steshenko
 Fate uncertain: Mykola Stasyuk, Aleksandr Zarubin

References

Ukrainian governments
1917 establishments in Ukraine
1917 disestablishments in Ukraine
Cabinets established in 1917
Cabinets disestablished in 1917
Ukrainian People's Republic